Walter Borho (born 17 December 1945, in Hamburg) is a German mathematician, who works on algebra and number theory.

Borho received his PhD in 1973 from the University of Hamburg under the direction of Ernst Witt with thesis Wesentliche ganze Erweiterungen kommutativer Ringe. He is a professor at the University of Wuppertal.

Borho does research on representation theory, Lie algebras, ring theory and also on number theory (amicable numbers) and tilings.

In 1986 he was an invited speaker at the International Congress of Mathematicians in Berkeley (Nilpotent orbits, primitive ideals and characteristic classes – a survey).

Publications

Borho, Don Zagier et al.: Lebendige Zahlen, Birkhäuser 1981 (containing Borho's Befreundete Zahlen [Amicable Numbers])
with Peter Gabriel, Rudolf Rentschler: Primideale in Einhüllenden auflösbarer Lie-Algebren, Springer Verlag, Lecture Notes in Mathematics, vol. 357, 1973
with Klaus Bongartz, D. Mertens, A. Steins: Farbige Parkette. Mathematische Theorie und Ausführung auf dem Computer [Colored tilings: mathematical theory and computer implementation], Birkhäuser 1988
with Jean-Luc Brylinski, Robert MacPherson: Nilpotent orbits, primitive ideals and characteristic classes. A geometric perspective in ring theory, Birkhäuser 1989
with Karsten Blankenagel, Axel vom Stein:

References

External links

20th-century German mathematicians
21st-century German mathematicians
1945 births
Living people
University of Hamburg alumni
Academic staff of the University of Wuppertal